The Prince & Me is a 2004 American romantic comedy film directed by Martha Coolidge, and starring Julia Stiles, Luke Mably and Ben Miller, with Miranda Richardson, James Fox and Alberta Watson. The film focuses on Paige Morgan, a pre-med college student in Wisconsin, who is pursued by a Danish prince posing as an ordinary college student. The film had 3 direct-to-video sequels created under different writers and a new director, with Kam Heskin replacing Julia Stiles in the role of Paige Morgan: The Prince & Me 2: The Royal Wedding (2006), The Prince & Me: A Royal Honeymoon (2008), and The Prince & Me: The Elephant Adventure (2010).

Plot
Paige Morgan is an ambitious pre-medical student at the University of Wisconsin–Madison. Meanwhile, across the Atlantic, Denmark's Crown Prince Edvard prefers to live the life of a playboy, and when with his family often ignores or marginalizes his royal responsibilities.

Inspired by a television commercial showing Wisconsin co-eds flashing their breasts, Edvard meets with his parents, King Haraald and Queen Rosalind, and announces his intention to attend college in America—specifically, Wisconsin, and to do so anonymously. The Queen then dispatches Edvard's majordomo, Søren, to chaperone the trip. Arriving at the university, Edvard orders Søren to keep his identity a secret and to call him 'Eddie'.

Later at a bar, Eddie sees Paige serving and asks her to take off her shirt, like on television. Paige angrily drenches Eddie with the drink hose and bouncers escort Eddie from the bar. Eddie later apologizes to Paige, but she is annoyed when they are assigned as lab partners for an organic chemistry class. Since the class is important for Paige's medical school ambitions, she warns Eddie to not get in her way and reprimands him after he sleeps in through one of their lab experiments. Running out of money, Eddie gets a job in the deli section of the bar. Paige reluctantly helps him during his first day, and the two start to mend fences. Paige does well in science, but she struggles in an English literature class. Eddie uses his earlier education to help Paige gain a better understanding of William Shakespeare, and Paige instructs Edvard in common household chores like laundry.

Since Eddie is away from his family and unfamiliar with American holidays, Paige invites him to her parents’ dairy farm for Thanksgiving. Paige's father explains how he struggles to keep the small farm afloat, and Eddie uses his mechanical skills to fine-tune a riding mower for a race, which he wins. Keith Kopetsky, a rival racer reveals to be a sore loser and punches Eddie. After the fight that follows, Paige treats his grazes and they kiss for the first time.

Back at school, Eddie and Paige study for final exams. They sneak off to the library stacks to pursue a romantic encounter, where they kiss and take off his jacket and shirt. They are shortly ambushed by members of the Danish tabloid press. Once away from the mayhem, Paige learns his real identity and walks away from him through the rain. Just then, Eddie is notified by his mother that his father is very ill and she asks him to return home. While Paige is questioned at a viva voce panel about Shakespeare, she realizes that she loves Edvard and runs to find him, but his roommate Scotty tells her that he has already left for Denmark. She follows him there and while being driven round Copenhagen is delayed by a royal parade. Paige leaves her taxi and is recognized from the papers by the crowd, who call Edvard’s attention to her. He mounts her behind him on his horse, hurriedly opens a parliamentary session and takes her to the castle.

The queen objects to Edvard's choice, but the king tells him that if he loves Paige, he should marry her. Edvard proposes and Paige accepts. After witnessing him reconcile workers and employers in a parliamentary committee, the queen realizes that Paige has helped him grow up at last and will make a good queen. However, during Eddie's coronation ball, Paige remembers that she is betraying her ambition to become a doctor working in Third World countries, breaks off her engagement and returns home.

King Haraald abdicates and the newly crowned Edvard realizes that he too has responsibilities to shoulder. However, he arrives after Paige’s graduation and tells her that she is his choice and he is willing to wait for however long it takes to achieve her dreams.

Cast

Soundtrack
The film's soundtrack was released on March 30, 2004, in the United States by Hollywood Records.

Track listing

"Everybody Wants You" - Josh Kelley
"Just a Ride" - Jem
"Fire Escape" - Fastball
"Man of the World" - Marc Cohn
"Calling" - Leona Naess
"Good Intentions" - Jennifer Stills
"I Hope That I Don't Fall in Love with You" - Marc Cohn
"Symphony" - Jessica Riddle
"It Doesn’t Get Better Than This" - Katy Fitzgerald
"Freeway" - Scapegoat Wax
"Presidente" - Kinky
"Drift" - Forty Foot Echo
"Party" - The D4
"Bloodsweet" - Scapegoat Wax
"Separate Worlds" - Jennie Muskett

Reception
The film received negative reviews from critics and Rotten Tomatoes rated it 27% based on 116 reviews, an overall "rotten" rating. They called the film "bland, fluffy, and predictable bit of wish fulfillment". Metacritic reported the movie had an average score of 47 out of 100, based on 31 reviews. The Christian Science Monitor's David Sterritt gave the film a positive review, calling it "quite appealing, thanks to good-humored acting and to Martha Coolidge's quiet directing style." Meanwhile, Manohla Dargis of the Los Angeles Times gave the film a negative review, calling it "a blandly diverting, chastely conceived and grammatically challenged fairy tale" USA Today said that The Prince & Me was overall "well-meaning, cute, sweet" but that the film could have been improved with "a bit more quirkiness and a little less formula."

References

External links
 
 
 
 
 
 

2004 films
2004 romantic comedy films
American romantic comedy films
2000s English-language films
Fictional couples
Films about royalty
Films about princes
Films directed by Martha Coolidge
Films set in Copenhagen
Films set in universities and colleges
Films set in Madison, Wisconsin
Films shot in Denmark
Films shot in Prague
Films shot in Toronto
Icon Productions films
Lionsgate films
Paramount Pictures films
The Prince & Me films
2000s American films